Gordon Ramsay's Ultimate Cookery Course is a British cookery television series that aired from 10 September to 5 October 2012, on Channel 4. It is presented by celebrity chef Gordon Ramsay.

Description 
The show's concept is to demonstrate skills to the viewer to improve their skills as home cooks. The meals demonstrated by chef Gordon Ramsay are meant to represent a hundred core recipes. The first series of 20 episodes airs at 5 pm on Channel 4 in the UK. Along with Hugh's 3 Good Things (hosted by Hugh Fearnley-Whittingstall), and Jamie's 15-Minute Meals, Gordon Ramsay's Ultimate Cookery Course was one of three new daytime cookery shows announced by the channel. Joanna Plumb from Cherwood Nurseries in Chawston appeared to explain about chillis. Ramsay has released a cookbook to coincide with the series, published by Hodder & Stoughton in the UK.

Reception 
Mike Ward of The Daily Star chose the show as his pick of the day on the day the first episode aired, and stated that the lack of swearing "freaks" him out. It was also selected by Jane Simon of The Daily Mirror, saying that it was a return to cooking basics for Ramsay following his previous television show for Channel 4, Gordon Behind Bars. Cathy Spencer of The Shropshire Star enjoyed the first episode, saying "It was all simple, healthy exciting ingredients – and without an F-word in sight I think Gordon Ramsay will be winning himself a new legion of fans."

The first episode was watched by 1 million viewers, fewer than the 1.1 million watching BBC Two's Put Your Money Where Your Mouth Is.

Episodes

References 

2010s British television series
2012 British television series debuts
2012 British television series endings
British cooking television shows
Channel 4 original programming
Television series by All3Media